The Winston-Salem State Rams men's basketball team is the men's basketball team that represents Winston-Salem State University (WSSU) in Winston-Salem, North Carolina, United States.  The school's team currently competes in the NCAA Division II Central Intercollegiate Athletic Association. The school won the 1967 NCAA Division II championship.  Winston-Salem State competed in Division I from the 2007–08 season to the 2009–10 season as a transitional member of the Mid-Eastern Athletic Conference (MEAC); it returned to Division II in 2010 for financial reasons.

Among its notable coaches was Clarence "Big House" Gaines (1923–2005): during his 47-year tenure at WSSU as coach, professor, and athletic director, his men's basketball team compiled a record of 828–447. Gaines was inducted into the Naismith Memorial Basketball Hall of Fame in 1982.

Noted players under Gaines' era were Earl Monroe, Cleo Hill and sports commentator and columnist Stephen A. Smith. Alumnus Earl Williams, an American-Israeli basketball player, played for the school.

Postseason

NCAA Division II
The Rams have made the NCAA Division II men's basketball tournament fourteen times. The Rams have a record of 11–16.

See also
Clarence Gaines College Basketball Coach of the Year Awards

References

External links 
Team website